The Column of Justinian was a Roman triumphal column erected in Constantinople by the Byzantine emperor Justinian I in honour of his victories in 543. It stood in the western side of the great square of the Augustaeum, between the Hagia Sophia and the Great Palace, and survived until 1515, when it was demolished by the Ottomans.

Description and history
The column was made of brick, and covered with brass plaques. The column stood on a marble pedestal of seven steps, and was topped by a colossal bronze equestrian statue of the emperor in triumphal attire (the "dress of Achilles" as Procopius calls it), wearing an antique-style muscle cuirass, a plumed helmet of peacock feathers (the toupha), holding a globus cruciger on his left hand and stretching his right hand to the East. There is some evidence from the inscriptions on the statue that it may actually have been a reused earlier statue of Theodosius I or Theodosius II.

The column survived intact until late Byzantine times, when it was described by Nicephorus Gregoras, as well as by several Russian pilgrims to the city. The latter also mentioned the existence, before the column, of a group of three bronze statues of "pagan (or Saracen) emperors", placed on shorter columns or pedestals, who kneeled in submission before it. These apparently survived until the late 1420s, but were removed sometime before 1433. The column itself is described as being of great height, 70 meters according to Cristoforo Buondelmonti. It was visible from the sea, and once, according to Gregoras, when the toupha fell off, its restoration required the services of an acrobat, who used a rope slung from the roof of the Hagia Sophia.

By the 15th century, the statue, by virtue of its prominent position, was actually believed to be that of the city's founder, Constantine the Great. Other associations were also current: the Italian antiquarian Cyriacus of Ancona was told that it represented Heraclius. It was therefore widely held that the column, and in particular the large globus cruciger, or "apple", as it was popularly known, represented the city's genius loci. Consequently, its fall from the statue's hand, sometime between 1422 and 1427, was seen as a sign of the city's impending doom. Shortly after their conquest of the city in 1453, the Ottomans removed and dismantled the statue completely as a symbol of their dominion, while the column itself was destroyed around 1515. Pierre Gilles, a French scholar living in the city in the 1540s, gave an account of the statue's remaining fragments, which lay in the Topkapi Palace, before being melted to make cannons:

The appearance of the statue itself with its inscriptions is preserved, however, in a 1430s drawing (see left) made at the behest of Cyriacus of Ancona.

References

Sources

External links

3D reconstruction at the Byzantium 1200 project
Four fifteenth-century travellers look at the Statue of Justinian

540s establishments in the Byzantine Empire
Buildings and structures completed in the 6th century
Buildings of Justinian I
Justinian
Justinian
Equestrian statues in Turkey
Buildings and structures demolished in the 16th century
1515 disestablishments in the Ottoman Empire
543
1515 disestablishments in Europe
Cultural depictions of Justinian I
Statues of monarchs
6th-century sculptures